In psychiatry, thought broadcasting is the belief that others can hear or are aware of an individual's thoughts. The person experiencing this symptom can also think that their thoughts are being broadcast through different media, such as the television or the radio. Different people can experience thought broadcasting in different ways. Thought broadcasting is most commonly found among people that have schizophrenia, schizoaffective disorder, or bipolar disorder. People with thought broadcasting rarely admit to having this symptom or to the severity of the symptom.  Thought broadcasting is treated with the use of an atypical antipsychotic and in certain cases cognitive behavioral therapy.

Diagnosis and classification 
Thought broadcasting is considered a form of obsessive–compulsive disorder (OCD) and has multiple accepted definitions based on the many ways it can present itself. The first definition is that the person may hear their thoughts out loud and believe that others can hear the thoughts too. This definition relies on the fact that the thoughts are audible, through auditory hallucinations, in order for other people to hear them. The second definition consists of the individual believing that others can hear their thoughts with no associated auditory hallucinations and no real explanation of how others can hear the thoughts. The thoughts are said to be leaving the person's head silently, and the way their thoughts are known by others is unknown to the patient. A third possible definition is that the person believes that others are able to control or think with them and can hear their thoughts that way. The thoughts do not become audible to the patient since there are no auditory hallucinations.

An example of thought broadcasting would be if a student is sitting in class and is thinking about what he or she may have planned for the upcoming weekend. They may start to believe that their teacher can hear their plans, and that the teacher knows that they are not paying attention to the lecture being given. They may also believe that the other students in the classroom can hear their thoughts and may be judging them for the plans that they have. The student experiencing this symptom may then be embarrassed and become even more disengaged in the lesson since they may start to try to control their thoughts in order to make sure no one can hear anything they are thinking. Depending on the severity, they may even leave class or attempt to distance themselves from others in social situations.

Association with schizophrenia 
Thought broadcasting can be considered a positive symptom of schizophrenia. Thought broadcasting has been suggested as one of the first rank symptoms (Schneider's first-rank symptoms) believed to distinguish schizophrenia from other psychotic disorders.  The prevalence of comorbid OCD and schizophrenia ranges anywhere from 7.8% to 40.5%.  The width of this range may be explained by obsessive-compulsive (OC) symptoms commonly being overlooked due to their hierarchy in the diagnosis of schizophrenia.  OC symptoms may initially present or worsen in presentation with the use of atypical antipsychotics, a common treatment modality for schizophrenia. 

In mild manifestations, a person with this thought disorder may doubt their perception of thought broadcasting. When thought broadcasting occurs on a regular basis, the disorder can affect behavior and interfere with the person's ability to function in society. According to an individual's personality, this is considered to be a severe manifestation of thought broadcasting that is usually indicative of schizophrenia. Those who experience this symptom often steer clear from many social interactions, and can become socially isolated to ensure that no one can hear their thoughts. This symptom is often stress-induced, tends to worsen as their stress level increases, and may lessen when the individual is around those that they trust. In severe cases, the person may believe that people who are not even in the same room as them, or even in the house next door, can hear their thoughts.

Over time, thought broadcasting can shape how one thinks. If someone says a word or phrase similar to what the patient may have been thinking, that could catalyze this symptom, especially if it happens fairly frequently.

Treatment 
A combination of antipsychotic medication (such as Abilify, Zyprexa, Risperdal, and Clozaril) and psychotherapy are used to treat thought broadcasting.  Although case studies utilizing a combination of antipsychotics and cognitive behavioral therapy have been completed with mixed results, individuals with psychotic disorders are often excluded from clinical trials studying psychological treatments for obsessive-compulsive symptoms.

See also 

Thought withdrawal
Thought insertion
Imaginary audience
Paranoia
Hallucination
Delusion
Telepathy
Folie à deux
Brain-reading
Microwave auditory effect

References

External links 
 Thought Broadcasting: When Your Thoughts Are No Longer Your Own, Discover Magazine, by Eric Taipale, Feb 12, 2022 

Delusional disorders